William Arthur Belk (born February 19, 1946) is a former American football defensive lineman in the National Football League (NFL). He was drafted by the San Francisco 49ers in the 6th round of the 1968 NFL Draft. He played college football at Maryland Eastern Shore.  He played for the Toronto Argonauts in the Canadian Football League in 1975 and 1976. He played a total of 9 years of professional football.

Belk was inducted into the University of Maryland Eastern-Shore Hall of Fame in 1984. His collegiate career spanned from 1964 to 1968. In college, Belk was a two-way starter at
offensive and defensive end. He received All-Conference honors in 1966 and 1967, and was co-captain of the team his senior year. While in college, Belk was a student athlete, making the honor roll and dean’s list. He graduated in 1968, earning a bachelor's degree in Business Education.

In the NFL, Belk proved to be a versatile, reliable, and very intelligent football player, starting at both defensive end and tackle. One of his coaches, Dick Nolan, made this testimony in reference to Belk, “What I like about Bill is that he’s very smart. He knows exactly what he’s doing out there and can adjust to any situation."

1946 births
Living people
American football defensive ends
American football defensive tackles
Maryland Eastern Shore Hawks football players
San Francisco 49ers players
People from Lancaster, South Carolina